Slightly Foxed is a British quarterly literary magazine. Its primary focus is books and book culture. 2016 saw the publication of its fiftieth issue. Notable authors to have written for the magazine include Penelope Lively, Richard Mabey, Diana Athill, Ronald Blythe and Robert Macfarlane.

Instead of books currently marketed by big publishers, Slightly Foxed tends to examine older and more obscure titles. Its title comes from the term "slightly foxed" as a description of a book's physical quality, commonly used in the second-hand book trade to describe minor foxing, the occurrence of brown spots on older paper.

As well as the magazine itself, Slightly Foxed has a books imprint, and between 2009 and 2016 ran a bookshop on London's Gloucester Road.

The magazine offices are based in London.

References

Magazines established in 2004
Quarterly magazines published in the United Kingdom
Literary magazines published in the United Kingdom
Magazines published in London
Book review magazines